Article 48 of the constitution of the Weimar Republic of Germany (1919–1933) allowed the President, under certain circumstances, to take emergency measures without the prior consent of the Reichstag. This power was understood to include the promulgation of "emergency decrees". The law allowed Chancellor Adolf Hitler, with decrees issued by President Paul von Hindenburg, to create a totalitarian dictatorship after the Nazi Party's rise to power in the early 1930s.

Text

History 
Following the Treaty of Versailles, there was a period of hyperinflation in the Weimar Republic between 1921 and 1923, then the Occupation of the Ruhr between 1923 and 1925. Friedrich Ebert, a Social Democrat and the Republic's first President, used Article 48 on 136 occasions, including the deposition of lawfully elected governments in Saxony and Thuringia when those appeared disorderly. On 29 August 1921 an emergency proclamation was issued limiting the wearing of imperial military uniforms to current serving members of the armed forces. Ebert had granted Chancellor Wilhelm Cuno considerable latitude under Article 48 to deal with the inflation and with matters related to the Reichsmark. The Emminger Reform of 4 January 1924 abolished the jury system as triers of fact within the judiciary of Germany and replaced it with a mixed system of judges and lay judges which still exists.

Article 48 was used by President Paul von Hindenburg in 1930 to deal with the economic crisis of the time.  During spring and summer 1930, Chancellor Heinrich Brüning found his government unable to obtain a parliamentary majority for its financial reform bill, which was voted down by the Reichstag,  but the government did not seriously try to negotiate with the Parliament to find a modus vivendi. Instead, Brüning asked Hindenburg to invoke Article 48 in order to promulgate the bill as an emergency decree and thereby give Brüning's government the authority to act without the consent of the Reichstag. When Hindenburg gave his authority and issued the decree, the Reichstag repudiated the decree, by a small majority on 18 July 1930. Under Article 48, this vote by a majority of the Reichstag members invalidated the presidential decree. Faced with a breakdown of parliamentary rule at a time when the economic situation demanded action, Brüning asked Hindenburg to dissolve parliament and call for new elections. The Reichstag was accordingly dissolved on 18 July and new elections were scheduled for 14 September 1930.

The election produced increased representation in the Reichstag for both the Communists and, most dramatically, for the Nazis, at the expense of the moderate middle-class parties. Forming a parliamentary majority became even more difficult for Brüning.  In fact, just to conduct the normal business of government, he was forced to invoke Article 48 several times between 1930 and 1932. Subsequent governments under chancellors Franz von Papen and Kurt von Schleicher during the tumultuous year 1932 obtained decrees from Hindenburg under Article 48 when they too found it impossible to obtain a parliamentary majority as the extremist parties on the left and right gained power.

The invocation of Article 48 by successive governments helped seal the fate of the Weimar Republic. While Brüning's first invocation of a Notverordnung may have been well-intentioned, the power to rule by decree became increasingly used not in response to a specific emergency but as a substitute for parliamentary leadership. The excessive use of the decree power and the fact that successive chancellors were no longer responsible to the Reichstag probably played a significant part in the loss of public confidence in constitutional democracy, in turn leading to the rise of the extremist parties.

Nazi use
On 30 January 1933, Adolf Hitler was named Chancellor. Lacking a majority in the Reichstag, Hitler formed a coalition with the national conservative German National People's Party (German: Deutschnationale Volkspartei, DNVP). Not long afterwards, he called elections for 5 March. Six days before the election, on 27 February, the Reichstag fire damaged the house of Parliament in Berlin. Claiming that the fire was the first step in a Communist revolution, the Nazis used the fire as a pretext to get the President, Hindenburg, to sign the Reichstag Fire Decree, officially the Verordnung des Reichspräsidenten zum Schutz von Volk und Staat (Presidential Decree for the Protection of People and State).

Under the decree, issued on the basis of Article 48, the government was given authority to curtail constitutional rights including habeas corpus, free expression of opinion, freedom of the press, rights of assembly, and the privacy of postal, telegraphic and telephonic communications. Constitutional restrictions on searches and confiscation of property were likewise rescinded.

The Reichstag Fire Decree was one of the first steps the Nazis took toward the establishment of a one-party dictatorship in Germany. With several key government posts in the hands of Nazis and with the constitutional protections on civil liberties suspended by the decree, the Nazis were able to use their control of the police to intimidate and arrest their opposition, in particular the Communists. Due to the use of Article 48, this repression had the mark of legality.

The 5 March elections gave the Nazi-DNVP coalition a narrow majority in the Reichstag.  Nonetheless, the Nazis were able to maneuver on 23 March 1933 the passage of the Enabling Act by the required two-thirds parliamentary majority, effectively abrogating the authority of the Reichstag and placing its authority in the hands of the Cabinet (in effect, the Chancellor). This had the effect of giving Hitler dictatorial powers.

Over the years, Hitler used Article 48 to give his dictatorship the stamp of legality. Thousands of his decrees were based explicitly on the Reichstag Fire Decree, and hence on Article 48, allowing Hitler to rule under what amounted to martial law. This was a major reason why Hitler never formally repealed the Weimar Constitution, though it had effectively been rendered a dead letter with the passage of the Enabling Act.

Lessons learned
The misuse of Article 48 was fresh in the minds of the framers of the Basic Law for the Federal Republic of Germany.  They decided to significantly curb the powers of the president, to the point that he, unlike his Weimar predecessor, has little de facto executive power. Also, to prevent a government from being forced to rely on decrees to carry on normal business, they stipulated that a chancellor may only be removed from office via a constructive vote of no confidence. That is, a chancellor can only be voted out of office if his prospective successor already commands a majority.

Article 48 also influenced the framers of the French Constitution of 1958, whose Article 16 similarly allows the President of France to rule by decree in emergencies. The French article, however, includes much stronger safeguards against misuse than was the case in Weimar. The president is required to consult with the prime minister and the presidents of both houses of Parliament before issuing emergency decrees; these decrees, in turn, cannot be used to suspend civil rights and liberties, but are instead required to be designed to restore the normal rules of the Constitution. That is, the president cannot use Article 16 as a substitute for parliamentary confidence. Article 16 also prohibits the dissolution of the National Assembly while an emergency is in effect, while Parliament retains the right to submit emergency decrees to the Constitutional Council, which has the power to invalidate them if the conditions necessary for the article's invocation no longer exist.

Interpretation
The text of the Article 48 neither precisely defined the kind of emergency that would justify its use nor expressly granted to the President the power to enact, issue, or otherwise promulgate legislation. However, such an inherent Presidential legislative power was clearly implied, as the Article expressly gave the Reichstag the power to cancel the emergency decree by a simple majority vote. That parliamentary power implied that a decree could, either by its express terms or its operation, impinge on the Reichstag's constitutional function.

Article 48 required the President to inform the Reichstag immediately of the issuance of the emergency decree and gave the Reichstag the power to nullify the emergency decree by simple majority action. The Reichsrat, the upper house, was not involved in the process at all. If the Reichstag nullified the decree, the President could retaliate by using the power, under Article 25, to dissolve the Reichstag and call for new elections within 60 days.

See also 
 Machtergreifung
 State of emergency
 State of exception

References

1919 in law
Emergency laws in Germany
Constitutional history of Germany
1933 in Germany
Politics of the Weimar Republic